The simple station 21 Ángeles is part of the TransMilenio mass-transit system of Bogotá, Colombia, which opened in the year 2000.

Location

The station is located in northwestern Bogotá, specifically on Avenida Suba  with Transversal 84.

The station serves the demand of the Los Pinos area, Las Terrazas, as well as the Altos de Chozica and Provenza neighborhoods.

A few blocks away is the bridge that connects the two hills of Suba, separated by the avenue (Transversal 66 or 81).

History

In 2006, phase two of the TransMilenio system was completed, including the Avenida Suba line, on which this station is located.

The station is named 21 Ángeles due to its proximity to the site where 21 students of the Agustianio Norte school were killed on April 28, 2004 when the bus on which they were riding was crushed by a construction vehicle that was on the higher road. The roads in this area are at different heights due to the difficult, mountainous terrain.

Station Services

Main line service

Dual services

Special Services 
The following special route also works:

  to the Tuna Alta neighborhood.

Inter-city service

This station does not have inter-city service.

External links
TransMilenio
suRumbo.com

See also
Bogotá
TransMilenio
List of TransMilenio Stations

TransMilenio